Hippocentrodes is a genus of horse flies in the family Tabanidae.

Species
Hippocentrodes desmotes Philip, 1961
Hippocentrodes striatipennis (Brunetti, 1912)

References

Tabanidae
Brachycera genera
Diptera of Asia
Taxa named by Cornelius Becker Philip